Tatranská Javorina (Hungarian: Tátrajavorina) is a village in Poprad District in the Prešov Region of northern Slovakia.

Geography
The municipality lies at an altitude of 1000 metres and covers an area of 94.041 km². It has a population of about 230 people.
It is located by the Javorová Valley in the Tatra Mountains at the Polish border.

History
The beginnings of the municipality are in the 18th century. The name of the village stems from the former maple (Slovak: javor) forests, after which some geographical objects were named (brook Javorinka, Javorová Valley and Javorový štít). Between 1918 and 1921 the Polish government several times wanted to make the village as well as adjacent Tatra valleys part of Poland, later on the Poles negotiated with Czechoslovakia about change of the border, but unsuccessfully. On November 1, 1938, after the Munich Agreement, Poland took control over the village. It was captured by the Slovaks in September 1939 (see: Polish September Campaign and Field Army Bernolák) and it has been part of Slovakia ever since.

See also
Polish-Czechoslovak border conflicts

References

External links
http://tatranskajavorina.e-obce.sk/
http://www.vysoketatry.com/obce/tjavorina/tjavorina.html Information on vysoketatry.com portal
http://panoramy.sme.sk/panorama/1004/tatranska-javorina/ Panoramas of Tatranská Javorina

fix indexing
Kraków Voivodeship (1919–1939)–